John Jairo Ruiz Barrantes (born January 10, 1994) is a Costa Rican footballer who plays for Herediano.

Club career

C.D. Saprissa
John Jairo began his career with C.D. Saprissa in 2011, scoring one goal against San Carlos on 11 September 2011. During the absence of Jairo Arrieta, Ruiz emerged as Saprissa's top striker in December 2011.

Lille OSC
In January 2012, Ruiz signed a four-year contract with French side Lille OSC, and was playing with the reserve team until he was sidelined by injuries. In July 2012, Lille agreed a deal to send Ruiz to Belgian newly promoted Belgian Second Division team Royal Mouscron-Péruwelz on loan. After the 2013–14 season he spent playing with the first team and Lille II equally, Ruiz moved on new loan to Oostende, where he spent the whole 2014–15 season. On 25 August 2015, Ruiz was loaned to Ukrainian club Dnipro Dnipropetrovsk.

Red Star Belgrade
On June 28, 2016, Ruiz signed a three-year contract with Red Star Belgrade. He made his debut in an official match for Red Star on July 12, in the first leg of the second qualifying round of the 2016–17 UEFA Champions League in a game Red Star was playing against Valletta F.C. away. Red Star won 1–2, and Ruiz entered as a substitute of Aleksandar Katai in 83rd minute.

Al-Fayha
On August 9, 2017, Ruiz signed a three-year contract with Al-Fayha.

Return to Saprissa 
In 2019, Ruiz returned to his boyhood club, Saprissa.

Ironi Kiryat Shmona
On 3 July 2019 Ruiz signed the Israeli Premier League club Ironi Kiryat Shmona.

C.S. Herediano
In January 2020 signed to Herediano.

International career
Ruiz was selected in Costa Rica national team for the 2011 CONCACAF U-17 Championship and he was named in the 2011 CONCACAF U-20 Championship. He participated in the 2011 FIFA U-20 World Cup finals in Colombia, where he scored Costa Rica's first goal of the tournament.
Ruiz earned  his inaugural senior cap on 6 March 2014 in the 2:1 win over Paraguay in a friendly match after coming on as a second-half substitute for Bryan Ruiz.

After a solid start at the 2016–17 season with Red Star, Ruiz was one of the six legionnaires selected for the Costa Rica national team for the 2017 Copa Centroamericana.

Career statistics

Club

International

Young international goals
Scores and results list Costa Rica's goal tally first.

International goals
Scores and results list. Costa Rica's goal tally first.

References

External links
 
 
 
 

1994 births
Living people
People from Puntarenas
Association football forwards
Costa Rican footballers
Costa Rican expatriate footballers
Costa Rica under-20 international footballers
Costa Rica international footballers
Deportivo Saprissa players
Lille OSC players
Royal Excel Mouscron players
K.V. Oostende players
FC Dnipro players
Al-Fayha FC players
Red Star Belgrade footballers
Hapoel Ironi Kiryat Shmona F.C. players
C.S. Herediano footballers
Liga FPD players
Ligue 1 players
Belgian Pro League players
Ukrainian Premier League players
Saudi Professional League players
Serbian SuperLiga players
Israeli Premier League players
Challenger Pro League players
2017 Copa Centroamericana players
Costa Rican expatriate sportspeople in Serbia
Costa Rican expatriate sportspeople in France
Costa Rican expatriate sportspeople in Belgium
Costa Rican expatriate sportspeople in Ukraine
Expatriate footballers in Ukraine
Expatriate footballers in Serbia
Expatriate footballers in France
Expatriate footballers in Belgium
Expatriate footballers in Saudi Arabia
Expatriate footballers in Israel
Costa Rica youth international footballers